The Capri 26 is an American trailerable sailboat that was designed by Frank W. Butler and Gerry Douglas as a cruiser-racer and first built in 1990.

Production
The design was built by Catalina Yachts in the United States from 1990 to 1999, with 320 boats completed, but it is now out of production.

Design
The Capri 26 was designed in response to customer feedback from owners of smaller Capri series sailboats. Prospective buyers were looking for a slightly bigger boat with more "large boat" comforts and enough space for a family, while retaining the capability to be road transported by boat trailer.

The Capri 26 is a recreational keelboat, built predominantly of fiberglass, with wooden trim. It has a masthead sloop rig, a raked stem, a walk-through reverse transom, an internally mounted spade-type rudder controlled by a tiller and a fixed fin keel or optional shoal draft, wing keel.

The boat is fitted with a inboard two-cylinder diesel engine for docking and maneuvering.

The design has sleeping accommodation for four people, with two straight settees which can be joined over the lower-able drop-leaf table in the main cabin and an aft cabin with a large double berth under the cockpit. The galley is located on the starboard side just forward of the companionway ladder. The galley is equipped with a two-burner recessed stove, an ice box and a sink with a pressurized water supply. The spacious head is located just aft of companionway on the port side.

Ventilation is provided by four opening main cabin ports, plus one in the cockpit that provides fresh air to the aft cabin beneath.

Variants
Capri 26 fin keel
It displaces  and carries  of ballast.
Capri 26 wing keel
It displaces  and carries  of ballast.

Operational history
In a 2010 review Steve Henkel wrote, "the Capri 26 (actually 23' 8" on deck because of her sharply raked transom) is full of big-boat features, which might make her desirable to the big-and-tall crowd. Headroom is over six feet, and the beam of almost ten feet allows a humungus double berth in the main cabin—good for a couple sailing without kids or guests, but maybe not so good for overnight parties of four or more. Best features: Cockpit seats are deep and comfortable ... Worst features: The aft berth can feel somewhat constricted to those with claustrophobia. Racing the boat is a good possibility for those of competitive spirit, with her [PHRF] handicap of 210 and max speed of 6.4 [knots] due to her long waterline, but skippers should remember to stow all heavy gear ashore. Though the bow and stern areas might look tempting as stowage areas, for best boat speed they should be kept empty of any heavy gear—and there is no significant stowage area amidships, other than on the cabin sole under the table."

See also
List of sailing boat types

References

External links

Photo of a Capri 26
Photo of a Capri 26

Keelboats
1990s sailboat type designs
Sailing yachts
Trailer sailers
Sailboat type designs by Frank Butler
Sailboat types built by Catalina Yachts